The Pilsum Lighthouse was built in 1891 as a sector light for the Emshörn channel on Germany's North Sea coast. It is located on a dyke near the village of Pilsum in the municipality of Krummhörn. It guided ships through the narrow channel until 1915. During the First World War, its light was extinguished so that enemy ships could not navigate the route. After that, it was no longer needed, because the channel was changed. The height of the structure is 11 metres; the height of the light about sea level is 15 metres. Today, the tower is one of the best-known symbols of East Frisia.

Film 
The tower grew in popularity as a result of the film  ("Otto – the Outer Frisian") by comedian Otto Waalkes. In the film Otto lives in the lighthouse. Although the lighthouse is one of the central scenes in Otto – der Außerfriesische, for some reason the picture used on cinema advertisements and later on the inlays of the video and DVD editions was of the Westerheversand Lighthouse, not the Pilsum Lighthouse.

See also 

 List of lighthouses and lightvessels in Germany

References

External links 
 Pilsum Lighthouse 
 Information and photos of Pilsum Lighthouse at www.leuchtturm-welt.de 

Lighthouses completed in 1891
Lighthouses in Lower Saxony
East Frisia
1891 establishments in Germany
Buildings and structures in Aurich (district)